Prince is one of the 25 constituencies in the Kowloon City District in Hong Kong. The constituency returns one district councillor to the Kowloon City District Council, with an election every four years.

Prince constituency is loosely based on eastern part of the area around Prince Edward Road West and Boundary Street with an estimated population of 14,931.

Councillors represented

Election results

2010s

2000s

1990s

References

Kowloon Tong
Ho Man Tin
Constituencies of Hong Kong
Constituencies of Kowloon City District Council
1994 establishments in Hong Kong
Constituencies established in 1994